Sentimentally Yours is the third studio album by American country music singer Patsy Cline, released August 6, 1962. The album was the final studio album Cline would release before her death in a plane crash less than a year later. (Her last album was recorded in 1963 
and released posthumously.)

Background
Sentimentally Yours featured two of Cline's major hits singles that year. The first single, "She's Got You" was released early in 1962 and became a #1 hit on the Billboard Country Chart and crossed over into the Pop chart to #14, becoming another major crossover hit for Cline. The second single, a cover of "Heartaches", charted only on the Billboard Pop Chart in the United States. Both singles charted on the United Kingdom Singles Chart in 1962, becoming Cline's first singles to do so. The album did not include all of Cline's hits from that year. Her other hits included the Top 10 "When I Get Thru' With You" / "Imagine That" and the Top 15 hit "So Wrong," which were not released on albums.

The original version consisted of a two-sided LP, with six songs on each side. Decca merged with MCA in 1962 and the album was re-released under the MCA name in 1973. The album was then digitally remastered on a CD/LP/Cassette format for the third re-issue in 1988, which was also released on MCA Records. The original-released cover did not contain the yellow text underneath Cline's name. After "Heartaches" became a hit on the Pop charts in late 1962, the text "and featuring Heartaches" was added to the cover.

Recording
The first recordings for the album began August 25, 1961, and ended six months later on February 28, 1962. All sessions were produced by Owen Bradley, and held at the Bradley Film and Recording Studios in Nashville.
On December 17, Cline recorded "She's Got You" only. Between then and February, Cline did four more recording sessions to complete the number of songs needed for the album (12 songs were on this album).

Music
Out of the twelve songs this album consisted of, only two songs were new songs, "She's Got You" and the "She's Got You"'s flip side, "Strange". The ten remaining tracks were cover versions of standards. Some of the standards on this album included Jo Stafford's "You Belong to Me", Hank Williams' Half As Much, and Hank Williams' "Your Cheatin' Heart." The single "Heartaches" was also a standard recording. Cline did mainly standards for this album because it was an attempt to appeal to the Pop market.

Track listing
Side one
"She's Got You" (Hank Cochran) – 2:59
"Heartaches" (Al Hoffman, John Klenner) – 2:11
"That's My Desire" (Helmy Kresa, Carroll Loveday) – 3:01
"Your Cheatin' Heart" (Hank Williams) – 2:19
"Anytime" (Herbert "Happy" Lawson) – 1:57
"You Made Me Love You (I Didn't Want to Do It)" (Joseph McCarthy, James V. Monaco) – 2:45

Side two
"Strange" (Fred Burch, Mel Tillis) 2:13
"You Belong to Me" (Pee Wee King, Chilton Price, Redd Stewart) – 3:03
"You Were Only Fooling (While I Was Falling In Love)" (Billy Faber, Larry Fotine, Fred Meadows) – 1:56
"Half As Much" (Curley Williams) – 2:28
"I Can't Help It (If I'm Still in Love with You)" (Hank Williams) – 2:56
"Lonely Street" (Carl Belew, Kenny Sowder, W.S. Stevenson) – 2:32

Personnel

 Byron Bach – cello
 Brenton Banks – violin
 Owen Bradley – producer
 Harold Bradley – electric bass
 Cecil Brower – viola
 Howard Carpenter – viola
 Patsy Cline – lead vocals
 Floyd Cramer – organ
 Ray Edenton – rhythm guitar
 Solie Fott – violin
 Buddy Harman – drums
 Walter Haynes – steel guitar
 Randy Hughes – acoustic guitar
 Lillian Hunt – violin
 The Jordanaires – background vocals
 Grady Martin – electric guitar
 Charlie McCoy – harmonica
 Bob Moore – acoustic bass
 Bill Pursell – organ
 Verne Richardson – violin
 Hargus "Pig" Robbins – piano
 Ed Tarpley – viola
 Joe Zinkan – acoustic bass

Charts
Singles - Billboard (North America)

References

Patsy Cline albums
1962 albums
Decca Records albums
Albums produced by Owen Bradley
MCA Records albums